Tsatsa may refer to:

 , used in Buddhist stupas
 Tsatsa, Volgograd Oblast, a locality in Svetloyarsky District, Volgograd Oblast, Russia
 , a lake in Svetloyarsky District, Volgograd Oblast, Russia
 Tabitha Tsatsa, Zimbabwean athlete

See also 
 Zaza (disambiguation)